Kimberly Dos Ramos de Sousa (born April 15, 1992) is a Venezuelan actress. She is best known for her portrayal of Matilda Román in Nickelodeon's Grachi. She started her career in commercials and promotions for the Venezuelan television station Radio Caracas Television (RCTV). Dos Ramos played supporting roles in telenovelas produced by Venevisión and RCTV International, until she later gained recognition for her starring roles in successful telenovelas of Telemundo and Televisa.

Early life 
Dos Ramos was born in Venezuela to Portuguese parents on April 15, 1992. She has two brothers, Lance Dos Ramos, an actor and entertainer, and Lenny Dos Ramos, an actor. Dos Ramos became interested in acting at an early age. According to RCTV, Dos Ramos "interacted easily with the world of television," having already been exposed when her brothers went to auditions. As a child, Ramos appeared in various Venezuelan television programs, and at the age of four, she attended her first screen test.

Career

Beginnings, acting and animation (2000–2009) 
As a child actress, Dos Ramos appeared in the telenovelas Hechizo de amor, Más que amor, frenesí and Las González, all three created by Venevisión. In 2003, she marked her debut on RCTV in the telenovela La Cuaima in the supporting role of Bambi. In 2005, she was cast as Julieta in the telenovela Amor a palos. In 2008, she played the role of Eugenia in the RCTV telenovela La Trepadora, inspired by the 1925 novel of the same title by Rómulo Gallegos. During her career in RCTV, she shared credits with fellow actor Gabriel López.

In 2009, Dos Ramos worked as an animator for the RCTV comedy program Loco video loco.

Que el cielo me explique and Grachi (2010–2012) 
Dos Ramos returned to acting in late 2009 to play the role of Karen in what would be the last production of RCTV International, Que el cielo me explique. Filming for the telenovela began in December 2009, but was broadcast in the next year through Televen channel due to the blockage of RCTV in Venezuela. Que el cielo me explique was met with positive reviews from the Venezuelan and foreign audience. After filming for Que el cielo me explique concluded, Dos Ramos had several units in different auditions for the cast of Grachi, a teen fantasy series for Nickelodeon Latin America. She landed the role of Matilda Román, the arch-rival of Grachi Alonso (Isabella Castillo).

In Grachi, Matilda is a wealthy, spoiled and capricious girl who uses her powers to do bad things, and she also likes to dance and sing. Dos Ramos shared credits with her brother Lance Dos Ramos, who played the character José Manuel "Chema" Esquivel. She also participated in castings for the American adaptation of Spanish telenovela Física o Química, but was not selected. As part of the Grachi cast, she took part in recording the series' soundtrack album titled La vida es maravillosamente mágica. The album debuted at number twenty in the ranking of best-selling albums in Mexico and at number four in Argentina, where it remained for thirteen weeks. She participated in several promotional tours throughout Latin America with the main cast. Dos Ramos also performed songs for the Grachi soundtrack album titled La vida es maravillosamente mágica, Volume 2. She was also part of the musical tour Grachi: El show en vivo that traveled in some Latin American countries. From February 10, 2012, Dos Ramos and the rest of Grachi cast started a live musical tour based on the seriesThe live show was a commercial success, and positively received by the audience and critics. The second season of Grachi premiered on February 27, 2012, on Nickelodeon Latin America. In mid-April 2012, Dos Ramos traveled to Rome, Italy with the cast of Grachi to promote the series' second season.

Artistic growth and Telemundo era (2012–2015) 
Dos Ramos was going to reprise her role in the third season of Grachi as part of Nickelodeon Latin America's 2013 programming. On June 20, 2012, it was announced that Dos Ramos had been cast in the Telemundo telenovela El rostro de la venganza. She confirmed the news on her Twitter account and that she would not participate in the third season of Grachi.

El rostro de la venganza marked the debut of Dos Ramos in Telemundo. She played the supporting role of Katerina, the youngest daughter of the Alvarado family. Her acting performance in the telenovela was praised by the Latin American media. In 2013, Dos Ramos joined the cast of the family-themed telenovela Marido en alquiler with Sonya Smith, Juan Soler and Maritza Rodríguez. She shared credits with Gabriel Coronel.

Her major breakthrough role came when Dos Ramos starred in the hit Telemundo telenovela Tierra de reyes, based on the successful Pasión de Gavilanes, starring Aarón Díaz, Ana Lorena Sánchez, Gonzalo García Vivanco, Scarlet Gruber, Daniela Navarro, Christian de la Campa and Fabián Ríos. She portrayed the character of Irina, youngest of the three Del Junco sisters who deeply falls in love with Flavio, one of the three Gallardo brothers. In this project, Dos Ramos worked again with Sonya Smith who played as her mother, and reunited with Grachi lead star Isabella Castillo. Later on, she was cast in ¿Quién es quién?, an adaptation of Amor Descarado, starring Eugenio Siller in a double role alongside Danna Paola and Jonathan Islas. ¿Quién es quién? was the last project of Dos Ramos with Telemundo.

Televisa and Univision era (2016-present) 
Dos Ramos transferred to Televisa in 2016. In her first project with the network, she landed her breakthrough role portraying the antagonist Graciela in Vino el amor with Irina Baeva, Gabriel Soto, Cynthia Klitbo and Azela Robinson. She was reunited with Christian de la Campa who also plays an antagonist role in this telenovela.

In 2018, Dos Ramos was cast in the legal drama Por amar sin ley as Sofía, a lawyer who joins the Vega y Asociados law firm. She made her first appearance in the first-season finale, serving as a series regular in the second season. On February 7, 2020, executive producer José Alberto Castro confirmed that Por amar sin ley was renewed for a third season.

Dos Ramos portrayed a different version of Maribel de la Fuente in the 2020 reboot of Rubí, the latest remake of the 2004 hit Mexican telenovela of the same title.

In 2021, Dos Ramos starred as Isabela Gallardo in her most noted telenovela to date, the highly-successful La desalmada, featuring a large ensemble cast headed by Livia Brito, José Ron, Eduardo Santamarina, and many more. La desalmada marked the anticipated reunion between Dos Ramos and Gonzalo García Vivanco who previously paired together in Tierra de reyes. In May 2022, the telenovela has been renewed for a second season.

Public image and personal life 
Dos Ramos is considered to be an talented and beautiful actress, and People Magazine highlights her "natural beauty, charm, and her sculptural body". Dos Ramos received the title of "teen idol" for her performance as Matilda in Grachi. Her fans are called "Kimysta[s]".

She has expressed a desire to study business and to have a career working with numbers. According to Dos Ramos, her family is very important in her career because "without their support, I would not be here right now. My mom is always with me in all recordings, her companionship is fundamental".

Dos Ramos also admits to being a perfectionist. Her favourite food is pasta and she loves "all kinds of music".

Kimberly has received two nominations in consecutive years (2011 and 2012), and four in total, as "Despicable" in the Nickelodeon Latin America Kids Choice awards in Mexico and Argentina, as well as a nomination as "Gata do Ano" (girl of the year) in Brazil. Currently, Kimberly is studying Business Administration, and says she is single.

Influences 
Dos Ramos' major influences in her career are actors Daniela Alvarado, Emma Rabbe, Diego Boneta, Johnny Depp, Natalie Portman, Thalia, Édgar Ramírez  and Saúl Lisazo.

Filmography

Film

Television roles

Discography
 Grachi: La vida es maravillosamente mágica, Volume 2

Awards and nominations

References

External links 

 
 
 
 Kimberly Dos Ramos on Keek
 Kimberly Dos Ramos on Instagram

1992 births
Living people
Venezuelan telenovela actresses
Venezuelan television actresses
Venezuelan people of Portuguese descent
21st-century Venezuelan actresses